The 2019 Eastern Washington Eagles football team represented Eastern Washington University in the 2019 NCAA Division I FCS football season. The team was coached by third year head coach Aaron Best. The Eagles played their home games at Roos Field in Cheney, Washington and were a member of the Big Sky Conference. They finished the season 7–5, 6–2 in Big Sky play to finish in a three-way tie for third place.

Previous season

The Eagles finished the 2018 season 12–3, 7–1 in Big Sky play to finish in a three-way tie for first place. They received the third seed in the FCS Playoffs and advanced to the National Championship Game, where they lost to North Dakota State.

Preseason

Polls
On July 15, 2019 during the Big Sky Kickoff in Spokane, Washington, the Eagles were predicted to win the Big Sky by both the coaches and media.

Preseason All-Conference Team
The Eagles had one player selected to the Preseason All-Conference Team.

Chris Schlichting – Sr. OT

Award watch lists

Coaching/Personnel Changes
On January 18, defensive coordinator Jeff Schmedding left to take a position as linebackers coach/co-special teams coordinator with Boise State. Defensive line coach Eti Ena was promoted to replace Schmedding on January 23, 2019.

On February 9, former starting quarterback Gage Gubrud was granted a medical redshirt year by the NCAA after suffering a season-ending foot injury in a game against Montana State on September 29, 2018. He transferred to Washington State for his final year of eligibility.

On February 12, offensive coordinator Bodie Reeder left to become the co-offensive coordinator at North Texas. On February 25, Central Washington head coach Ian Shoemaker was hired to replace him.

Schedule
EWU has scheduled 12 games in the 2019 season instead of the 11 normally allowed for FCS programs. Under a standard provision of NCAA rules, all FCS teams are allowed to schedule 12 regular-season games in years in which the period starting with Labor Day weekend and ending with the last Saturday of November contains 14 Saturdays.

Source: Schedule 

Despite also being a member of the Big Sky, the game vs. Idaho will count as a non-conference game and will have no effect on the Big Sky standings.

Although North Dakota is classified as an FCS Independent, games against them still count as Big Sky conference games through the 2019 season.

Game summaries

at Washington

Lindenwood

at Jacksonville State

at Idaho

North Dakota

at Sacramento State

Northern Colorado

at Montana

Northern Arizona

at Idaho State

at Cal Poly

Portland State

Ranking movements

References

Eastern Washington
Eastern Washington Eagles football seasons
Eastern Washington Eagles football